Daniel Mackintosh FGS (1815 - 19 July 1891) was a Scottish geomorphologist and ethnologist.  He was a correspondent with Charles Darwin.

References

External links
 

1815 births
1891 deaths
Fellows of the Geological Society of London